Ocheyoherpia is a genus of sterrofustian solenogasters, shell-less, worm-like, marinemollusks.

References

Sterrofustia